Coelolepida is a clade of insects in the lepidopteran order, containing the infraorders Acanthoctesia and Lophocoronina.

Coelolepida comprise all non-eriocraniid Glossata. They have scales on their wings and on the first thoracic spiracle. They do not have ocelli.

Fossils of Coelolepida have been found in the mid Early Cretaceous period.

See also
Taxonomy of the Lepidoptera#Suborder Glossata

References

 
Lepidoptera taxonomy
Glossata